Aaron Buchanan Hickey (born 10 June 2002) is a Scottish professional footballer who plays as a left-back for Premier League club Brentford and the Scotland national team. He has previously played for Heart of Midlothian and Bologna.

Club career

Early career
After spending time in the youth system at Heart of Midlothian, Hickey had a spell with the academy teams at Celtic. After four years at Celtic he chose to return to Hearts in 2018, with Celtic receiving 30% of a future transfer fee.

Hearts
On 10 May 2019, Hickey made his debut for the club in a 2–1 loss away to Aberdeen, in the penultimate game of the 2018–19 season. On 25 May 2019, Hickey started in the 2019 Scottish Cup Final against Celtic, becoming the youngest player to appear in the final since John Fleck in 2008.

On 22 September 2019, he scored his first senior goal, the winner in the Edinburgh derby as Hearts won 2–1 away at Hibernian.

In August 2020 he was linked with a transfer away from the club, with interest from German club Bayern Munich, Italian club Bologna, English club Aston Villa, and French club Lyon. Hearts manager Craig Levein also revealed that Celtic had made "five or six" attempts to sign Hickey. Towards the end of the month the BBC reported that Bologna had made the first official bid for Hickey, although Hearts said that the offer was too low.

Bologna
Bologna made an updated offer for Hickey, which was accepted by Hearts on 8 September 2020. On 24 September 2020, Hickey completed a moved to the Serie A side for an undisclosed fee believed to be around £1.5 million. He said he chose Bologna over Bayern due to the Italian club's family feel, and their intention to use him in their first-team. Due to the suspension of regular left-back Mitchell Dijks, Hickey made his first Serie A appearance on 28 September in a 4–1 win against Parma. His first season at Bologna was cut short by injury in March 2021, restricting him to 12 appearances. At the end of the season, he was nominated for the 2021 Golden Boy award.

Hickey returned to Bologna's first team following his injury, starting the first game of the 2021–22 season against Salernitana, which Bologna won 3–2.
On 21 September 2021, Hickey scored his first goal for Bologna, in their 2–2 draw with Genoa in the Serie A. In November 2021 he was described as "flourishing in Serie A with Bologna". On 24 April 2022, Hickey became the first Scot to score 5 goals in a single Serie A season since Graeme Souness in 1984–85 for Sampdoria.

Brentford
Bologna accepted an offer for Hickey from Premier League club Brentford in July 2022. On 9 July 2022, Brentford announced that they had signed Hickey on a four-year contract, subject to international clearance.

International career
Hickey has represented Scotland U17, making his debut for the side in a 0–0 draw against France U17 on 5 February 2019.

He was selected in the Scotland U21 squad for the first time in November 2020,  but withdrew due to injury. He was recalled in September 2021, but pulled out from that squad due to another injury. He then also withdrew from the following squad, saying he wanted to rest.

In March 2022, after being left out of the under-21 squad, Hickey was included in the senior Scotland squad for the first time. He made his senior international debut on 24 March in a 1–1 draw with Poland.

Style of play
Primarily a left-back, Hickey can also play as a central midfielder, and also right-back and centre-back, and his "versatility is yet another key attribute". Former Hearts manager Craig Levein described Hickey by saying that "he's got really good defensive qualities but I don't know if he'll end up being a full-back, he might end up going back into midfield [...] he could be a fantastic holding midfielder with his great awareness of danger and his ability to get out of tight situations with the ball at his feet". Levein has also said that Hickey is shy, quiet, and reserved.

Hearts captain Steven Naismith has praised Hickey's intelligence, while Hearts head coach Robbie Neilson praised his maturity, saying that "he's like a 24- or 25-year-old in an 18-year-old's body [...] he's very mature for his age, he's composed, has good physique, ticks all the boxes".

Hickey has been compared to fellow Scottish left-back Andy Robertson, although Hickey has played down the links.

Personal life
On 13 December 2020, he tested positive for COVID-19.

Career statistics

Club

International

References

2002 births
Living people
Scottish footballers
Association football fullbacks
Association football midfielders
Heart of Midlothian F.C. players
Celtic F.C. players
Bologna F.C. 1909 players
Brentford F.C. players
Scottish Professional Football League players
Serie A players
Premier League players
Scotland youth international footballers
Scotland international footballers
Scottish expatriate footballers
Expatriate footballers in Italy
Scottish expatriate sportspeople in Italy